1197 Rhodesia, provisional designation , is a dark background asteroid from the outer regions of the asteroid belt, approximately  in diameter. It was discovered on 9 June 1931, by South African astronomer Cyril Jackson at the Union Observatory in Johannesburg. The likely C-type asteroid has a rotation period of 16.1 hours. It was named for Rhodesia, a former British colony and unrecognised state, which is now Zimbabwe.

Orbit and classification 

Rhodesia is a non-family asteroid from the main belt's background population. It orbits the Sun in the outer asteroid belt at a distance of 2.2–3.6 AU once every 4 years and 11 months (1,791 days; semi-major axis of 2.89 AU). Its orbit has an eccentricity of 0.23 and an inclination of 13° with respect to the ecliptic. The asteroid was first observed at Heidelberg Observatory in January 1925. The body's observation arc also begins at Heidelberg in August 1942, more than 11 years after its official discovery observation at Johannesburg.

Naming 

This minor planet was named for the former British colony and unrecognized state of Rhodesia (1965–1979) in southern Africa, what is now Zimbabwe. The official naming citation was mentioned in The Names of the Minor Planets by Paul Herget in 1955.

Physical characteristics 

Rhodesia is an assumed C-type asteroid which agrees with its albedo and its location in the main belt. It has a B–V color index of 0.740.

Rotation period 

In December 2017, a rotational lightcurve of Rhodesia was obtained from photometric observations by Tom Polakis at the Command Module Observatory  in Tempe, Arizona. Lightcurve analysis gave a rotation period of  hours with a brightness variation of 0.27 magnitude. This result refines previous period determinations of 15.89 and 16.062 hours by Richard Binzel (1984) and Laurent Bernasconi (2005), respectively.

Diameter and albedo 

According to the surveys carried out by the Infrared Astronomical Satellite IRAS, the Japanese Akari satellite and the NEOWISE mission of NASA's Wide-field Infrared Survey Explorer, Rhodesia measures between 46.43 and 52.276 kilometers in diameter and its surface has an albedo between 0.0548 and 0.0783. The Collaborative Asteroid Lightcurve Link derives an albedo of 0.0666 and a diameter of 47.40 kilometers based on an absolute magnitude of 10.18. In August 2015, an occultation by Rhodesia determined a cross-section of 48.0 × 48.0 kilometers (no fit).

References

External links 
 Asteroid Lightcurve Database (LCDB), query form (info )
 Dictionary of Minor Planet Names, Google books
 Asteroids and comets rotation curves, CdR – Observatoire de Genève, Raoul Behrend
 Discovery Circumstances: Numbered Minor Planets (1)-(5000) – Minor Planet Center
 
 

001197
Discoveries by Cyril Jackson (astronomer)
Named minor planets
19310609